The Algemeen Dagblad or AD (English: "General Daily Paper") is a Dutch daily newspaper based in Rotterdam, Netherlands.

History and profile
Algemeen Dagblad was founded in 1946.  The paper is published in tabloid format and is headquartered in Rotterdam. Its regional focus includes the cities and regions around Rotterdam, Utrecht and The Hague. In South Holland and Utrecht it is published and distributed with local dailies. The national edition is for sale everywhere and distributed throughout the rest of the Netherlands. AD is owned by DPG Media (known as De Persgroep until 2019) and is published by PCM Uitgevers NV.

AD includes a regional supplement in the districts previously served by these regional papers. Two of them, the AD Haagsche Courant (for The Hague region) and the AD Rotterdams Dagblad (for the Rotterdam region) appear in both a morning and an evening edition.

 Rotterdams Dagblad -> AD Rotterdams Dagblad
 Goudsche Courant -> AD Groene Hart
 Rijn & Gouwe -> AD Groene Hart
 Haagsche Courant -> AD Haagsche Courant
 Utrechts Nieuwsblad -> AD Utrechts Nieuwsblad
 Amersfoortsche Courant -> AD Amersfoortsche Courant
 De Dordtenaar -> AD De Dordtenaar Dagblad Rivierenland -> AD Rivierenland 

Chief editors

Het VaderlandHet Vaderland was an independent newspaper founded in the Hague in 1869. In 1972, it became a regional supplement of Algemeen Dagblad for The Hague. In 1982, the newspaper was dissolved.

Circulation
In the period of 1995–1996 AD had a circulation of 401,000 copies, making it the second best-selling paper in the country. In 2001 its circulation was 335,000 copies. In 2013 the paper was the second largest paid newspaper of the Netherlands after De Telegraaf''. After a merger with seven regional newspapers on 1 September 2005 and ongoing reduction in readership, it had an average circulation merger of 365,912 copies in 2014. In 2017, it was down to 341,249 copies.

References

External links

1946 establishments in the Netherlands
Dutch-language newspapers
Dutch news websites
Mass media in Rotterdam
Daily newspapers published in the Netherlands
Newspapers established in 1946